Lanty may refer to:

People
 Alain Lanty (born 1961), French singer, composer and pianist
 Lanty Slee (1800–1878), English smuggler

Places
 Lanty, Arkansas, United States
 Lanty, Nièvre, France
 Lanty-sur-Aube, France